Astrid Emma Kristina Olsson Hedberg, (born 4 March 1970) is a Swedish journalist and television presenter. She has mostly worked as a radiojournalist for Sveriges Radio, where she worked for the news shows Dagens Eko, Ekots lördagsintervju and the investigative show Kaliber. She has also been a television presenter for SVT, for the shows Uppdrag Granskning, the interview show Min Sanning. And since 2013, she is the presenter of the debate show Debatt, where she replaced Belinda Olsson. Hedberg is married to sports journalist Christian Olsson and is the daughter of professor Bo Hedberg.

References

External links 

Living people
1970 births
Swedish journalists
Swedish television personalities
Swedish women journalists
Swedish women television presenters
People from Gothenburg
21st-century Swedish women